Encina de San Silvestre is a village and municipality in the province of Salamanca,  western Spain, part of the autonomous community of Castile and León.

Geography

The postal code is 37114.

Spanish poet and musician Juan del Enzina was born in the village.

See also
List of municipalities in Salamanca

References

Municipalities in the Province of Salamanca